Whitwarta is a town in South Australia.  The town is situated beside the Wakefield River (known as Undalya to the Indigenous people) about 100 km north of the state capital, Adelaide.  The name Whitwarta means freshwater (distorted from Whitarter), a reference to the freshwater springs that exist along the pronounced bend in the river nearby. The constant availability of freshwater along an otherwise dry river (the Rocks upstream of Balaklava is the next closest and permanent waterhole) meant that Whitwarta was a suitable place to establish a village. Approximately 20 people now live in the village.

Geographically, Whitwarta is situated on the plains, almost halfway between the Clare Valley and Skilly Hills to the East and the Southern Hummocks Ranges to the West. A series of salt lakes pepper the countryside to the West and North East of Whitwarta.

The old Whitwarta School (1879–1951) still stands at the northern end of the village on Bowman St, as does the Post Office at the southern end. The church and Whitwarta Hotel along the Kadina Road were damaged by floods during the 1900s, and were demolished as a consequence. The last flood occurred in September 2010 (the previous flood occurred in summer of 1998). A number of Eucalyptus camaldulensis sprouted on the flood plains and riparian zone shortly afterwards, some of which have been fenced-off by local farmers to avoid stock damage. A management plan for the River Wakefield was carried out in 2000, which included recommendations for the amelioration of water quality and flow at Whitwarta. Up until the late 1970s, it was common for the River Wakefield to flow every winter. Damming of the river upstream has impacted flows to the point that the River Wakefield now flows about once every five years. The trees around Whitwarta have suffered in recent years because of the rise of salinity in the soil. The National Trust of South Australia has listed a stand of Eucalyptus largiflorens (River Box) at Whitwarta on the significant tree registrar. Local farmers say that these trees sprouted after a flood in the early-mid 1900s.

A gliding club and rifle club are both located on the outskirts of Whitwarta.

Whitwarta once had a cricket team and a tennis club.

Traditional occupants 
According to the Manning Index of South Australian History the "Nantuwwara [sic] tribe of some 25 to 30 once occupied the country from the River Wakefield, north to Whitwarta and west to Hummock Range", an area which would encompass the modern localities of Bowmans, Whitwarta, Goyder, Beaufort, Nantawarra and Mount Templeton. The term Nantuwara (or Nantuwaru) is considered to be a specific name for the northern hordes of the Kaurna people. Stone implements thought to have been used by the Nantuwara people were discovered at sites adjoining the banks of the lower reaches of the River Wakefield and added to a South Australian Museum collection curated by Harold Cooper in the 1960s.

Major floods 

There are several accounts of major flooding of the Wakefield River at Whitwarta. The major floods recorded at Whitwarta occurred during the following years:
2010: Heavy rains throughout the catchment area of the Wakefield River caused major flooding at Whitwarata in early September. As in 1998, the water from the River flowed across the Whitarta to Balaklava Road (at the base of the Billabong Hill). It also flooded paddocks around the Whitwarta township, including the natural lagoon at the base of Whitwarta House. Water flowed across the Whitwarta to Kadina road. No damage to property or stock was recorded.
1998: The banks of the Wakefield River overflowed at Werocata and Whitwarta in winter. The water covered the Whitwarta to Balaklava Road and the Whitwarta to Kadina Road. The waters covered farmlands and remained for several months. Further rains in early summer 1998 caused the river to flood again. The old ruins of the Whitwarta Hotel were underwater, as was the depression behind the Whitwarta township. Locals caught European Carp in the waters that remained pooled in this depression. Such was the amount of water in the region, locals observed the appearance of brine shrimp in the waters of nearby salt lakes (especially the lakes near the northern lagoon of Diamond Lake).
1937: The Canberra Times on Sept 3, 1937 reported that: "A torrent of water ten chains wide, is sweeping across Whitwarta Road from Werochea [Werocata] station"

Historic Whitwarta personalities and stories

Trades and professions
In 1881, the follow trades and professions for Whitwarta were recorded in Wright's Australian and American commercial directory and gazetteer.

Storekeeper: R.T. Wilson
Hotel: 'Whitwarta' David Pink
Wheelwright: M. Koefner

Teachers at the Whitwarta School 
Research by the University of South Australia indicates that the following teachers served at the now defunct Whitwarta School from 1879–1947: 

Source:

Whitwarta residents involvement in World War I
Soon after World War I, a gathering at the school on Arbor Day, 19 August 1918, saw the unveiling of a roll of honor. It commemorated the ten old scholars who had served in the armed forces, including three who had been killed. These included Driver Eric R. Lange, who died from gunshot wounds in action in France less than two years after he enlisted with the 9th Light Horse Regiment. Another was Private Stanley Roy Angel who enlisted on 10 March 1917 and returned to Australia after the conclusion of the war, on 10 July 1919. He was also with the 9th Light Horse.

Pioneer Celebration 
On 3 December 2001 a number of local residents of Whitwarta gathered in front of Whitwarta House to celebrate the pioneers who shaped the township and the farms around it. A number of descendants of the original pioneers were present. A plaque was unveiled to commemorate the occasion. Esmond Hoepner of Whitwarta gave a plein-air presentation of the history and life of Whitwarta and its people.
A capsule was laid in concrete beneath the plaque. It is to be unveiled on 2 December 2101 by the Whitwarta residents of the time.

The plaque reads:
This plaque is erected to commemorate the pioneers of this township before 1900. Whitwarta was named before 1850 and surveyed into 69 allotments in 1879. Apart from a number of private dwellings it had:

Whitwarta Hotel 1886–1923
Telephone added in 1924
Wesleyan Church 1888–1920
Government Wells 1874–1912
Store and Post Office 1876–1967
Blacksmith 1878–1903
School 1879–1965

Names of some of the pioneers who made a valuable contribution in Whitwarta were

J. J. Angel, farmer
H. W. Clark, publican
J. R. F. Hoepner, blacksmith & wheelwright
J. Hudson, teamster
E. Router, farmer
R. T. Wilson, storekeeper & clerk
C. Belling, farmer*
W. J. Dunow, caretaker
R. Hornhardt, storekeeper
D. Pink, publican
J. Watson, builder

Whitwarta Cemetery 
The plaque reads that these "Two pioneers of South Australia arrived with the first Governor in H.M.S Buffalo 1836 and was present at the proclamation of the colony, Dec 28, 1836."

Whitwarta Bridge 
A bridge over the Wakefield River was constructed in approximately 1884. However, by 1912, this bridge was decaying due to white ants and dry rot, and too narrow for the traffic using it.

A new bridge was opened on 14 August 1914 by the Commissioner of Crown Lands, F. W. Young, accompanied by the other members of parliament for Wooroora, Oscar Duhst and David James and the chairman of the district council, Mr. F. McArdle.

Diamond Lake 

Diamond Lake, about 3 km west of the Whitwarta Village is a distinctive landscape feature of the region. It is an ephemeral salt lake. See location on Google Maps. The first Europeans to discover Diamond Lake, which they described as a 'dry lagoon', were the explorers John Hill and Thomas Burr, when passing through the Whitwarta district on 29 April 1840. A variety of wildfowl can be seen here when the Lake fills after winter rains, such as: Black Swans, Grey Teal, Chestnut Teal, Pacific Black Duck, Water Hens, and Plovers. Gypsum continues to be mined from the banks of the Lake. The Lake fills up from local rainfall-runoff, and fills from the northern lagoon first.

References

Towns in South Australia